Megan Williams (born 1956) is a contemporary artist who creates wall drawings, three-dimensional drawings, and traditional sculpture.

Early life and education 
Born in 1956 in Cleveland, Ohio, in the U.S., Williams earned a B.F.A. in 1978 from the California Institute of the Arts. As of 1990, Megan Williams was married, and had a son.

Critical reception 
Williams' earliest exhibits were collaborative. Mark Rosenthal of University of California's Berkeley Art Museum Pacific Film Archive commented  in 1978 that in Williams' collaboration with Jon Borofsky, "the artists worked on each other's images in the manner of participants in a jazz rhythm section who respond to one another's musical thoughts, alternately leading or following."

As early as 1983, art critics explicitly reviewed Williams' work favorably. John Russell of The New York Times called her an "artist of true quality". By 1993, Roberta Smith of The New York Times characterized her work as "figurative political art", comparing the "animated autonomy of her lines" with that of Betsy Friedman Murunashi-Lederman and Nicole Eiseman.

The Santa Monica Museum of Art 1990 description of Williams' wall drawing, Totem, pointed out she "took advantage of the freedom of working on a large scale and in an ephemeral situation". Williams herself explained her wall art: "I see an entire room as a blank sheet of paper, allowing the viewer to exist in it, rather than outside of it. It places the work in closer proximity to the psychological space with which we surround ourselves."

Christopher Miles of ArtForum in 2003 called Williams a "master of laugh-till-you-hurt images that invite our projections like Rorschach blots".  In 2008 he observed that Williams' practice was "turning the inner outward", a defining characteristic of her work, noting she "substitutes the goofy for the surreal, effecting what is indeed a kind of expressionism, but one that is as self-effacing and comic as it is assertive and heroic." Miles identified two modes that Williams uses: the first, lighthearted, optimistic contemplation; and the second, humor in a cartoon format to suggest "violence and angst". He wrote, "Williams' images, while fantastic and fairy-taleish in their specifics, are quite the opposite in their tenor and implications."

In 2008, critic Holly Myers of the Los Angeles Times described Williams' style as "unmistakable": using cartoonish forms such as human figures and anthropomorphized buildings; suggesting "rubbery agility, giddy pictorial buoyancy and an often furious sense of internally generated motion". A gallery's 2008 description of her work said it  was "populated by careening forces and dyspeptic explosions," noting one work was "sci-fi and apocalyptic", an "outburst of atomic proportions".

ArtsBlock at the University of California, Riverside, characterized Williams in 2014 as "a painter who uses cartoon imagery in her paintings that depict characters with riotous, bad mannered attitudes".

Selected exhibitions 
Williams has exhibited at multiple venues:
 Arena 1 Gallery, Santa Monica, "On the Wall", 2011
 Carl Berg Gallery, Los Angeles, "Purge, 2008"
 Center for the Arts, Eagle Rock
 Christopher Grimes Gallery
 The Corcoran Gallery of Art, Washington D.C.
 The Drawing Center, New York, "Selections, Fall 1991"
 Japanese American National Museum
 John Post Lee Gallery, New York
 Los Angeles Museum of Contemporary Art
 Museum of Contemporary Art, "Helter Skelter", 1992
 Orange County Museum of Art
 Otis/Parsons, Los Angeles
 Santa Monica Museum of Art, "Drawn from Memory", 1990
 Sweeney Art Gallery
 University Art Museum at UC Santa Barbara
 University of California, Berkeley Art Museum Pacific Film Archive
 Sweeney Art Gallery, UCR ArtsBlock, "Figurative Language"

Awards
1992 Art Matters Fellowship

1997 California Community Foundation's Fellowships for Visual Artists

References

External links 
 CV–Megan Williams

1956 births
20th-century American artists
20th-century American women artists
American women sculptors
Artists from Cleveland
American contemporary artists
California Institute of the Arts alumni
Living people
Sculptors from Ohio
21st-century American women artists